Johannes Jan "Joop" Atsma (born 6 July 1956) is a Dutch politician of the Christian Democratic Appeal (CDA) party and sport administrator. He has been a Member of the Senate since 9 June 2015.

Biography
Joop Atsma is the son of dairy farmer Pieter Atsma and Tjitske van der Meer. After secondary school, he began to study history to the University of Groningen, but he did not complete his studies.

In 1978 he began his career as a journalist, he worked for the Netherlands Broadcasting Foundation (NOS), Friesch Dagblad, News of the North and Omrop Fryslân.

From 1989 worked at the KNWU Straatsma, first as an amateur cycling section president and later as chairman. In the Olympic Games in Seoul (1988) Barcelona (1992) Atlanta (1996) and Sydney (2000) Atsma was chef d'equipe of cycling. In 2009, Joop Atsma appointed chairman of the Road Committee of the International cycling body UCI. This committee is responsible for such regulation of wegsport, admitting teams, fixture lists and qualification criteria for World Championships and Olympic Games. Atsma 178ste during the meeting of the International Cycling Union in Lugano in 2009 again elected to the Board of the Union Cycliste Internationale. From 1994 to 2006 he was chairman of the Royal Dutch Cycling Union.

Atsma began his political career as a member of the Provincial States of Friesland. In 1998, Atsma was elected to the House. He took his oath in the West Frisian language. In parliament he was involved with sports, agriculture, food, media and mining. He was also chairman of the Standing Committee for Agriculture, Nature and Food Quality and vice chair of the standing committee on Health, Welfare and Sports. On 14 October 2010 Atsma was appointed State Secretary for Infrastructure and Environment in the government-Rutte. Because of this appointment Atsma at that date resigned all paid and unpaid (side) functions and took distance from relevant business and financial interests.

Decorations

References

External links

Official
  J.J. (Joop) Atsma Parlement & Politiek
  J.J. Atsma (CDA) Eerste Kamer der Staten-Generaal

 

 

1956 births
Living people
Christian Democratic Appeal politicians
Dutch columnists
Dutch male cyclists
Dutch newspaper editors
Dutch political writers
Dutch sports executives and administrators
Dutch sports journalists
Knights of the Order of Orange-Nassau
Members of the House of Representatives (Netherlands)
Members of the Provincial Council of Friesland
Members of the Senate (Netherlands)
People from Achtkarspelen
Protestant Church Christians from the Netherlands
Reformed Churches Christians from the Netherlands
State Secretaries for Infrastructure of the Netherlands
Cyclists from Friesland
University of Groningen alumni
20th-century Dutch journalists
20th-century Dutch male writers
20th-century Dutch politicians
21st-century Dutch journalists
21st-century Dutch male writers
21st-century Dutch politicians